Dolan Township is an inactive township in Cass County, in the U.S. state of Missouri.

Dolan Township has the name of James Dolan, a pioneer settler.

References

Townships in Missouri
Townships in Cass County, Missouri